Felix ( 303) was a bishop of Thibiuca in Africa who was martyred during the Great Persecution under the Roman emperor Diocletian alongside Audactus, Fortunatus, Januarius, and Septimus. Felix is said to have resisted the command of the local magistrate Magnillian to surrender his church's copies of the Christian scriptures.

In one account, Felix and the others were taken to Carthage and decapitated on July 15. These  were venerated in the basilica of St Faustus. Another placed his martyrdom at Venosa in Italy. His companions may have been deacons but, apart from their joint martyrdom with Felix, are now unknown. Their feast day was observed jointly on October 24.

Felix was formerly honored as the patron saint of Venosa.

See also
 Other saints Felix
 Other saints Audactus
 Other saints Fortunatus
 Other saints Januarius
 Other saints Septimus

Notes

References

Citations

Bibliography
 .
 .

303 deaths
3rd-century bishops in Roman North Africa
4th-century Christian martyrs
Executed Tunisian people
Patron saints
People executed by the Roman Empire
Roman saints from Africa (continent)
Tunisian Christians
Christians martyred during the reign of Diocletian